Nothokemas is an extinct genus of camelid endemic to North America. Fossils have been found along the Gulf Coast from Texas to Florida.

References

Prehistoric camelids
Oligocene even-toed ungulates
Miocene even-toed ungulates
Burdigalian extinctions
Prehistoric mammals of North America
Chattian genus first appearances
Fossil taxa described in 1940